Sushil Kohli is an Indian swimmer and water polo player.
He was born on 19 April 1953. His father was the late Sh Mulkh Raj Kohli, who started the company Beat All Sports commonly known as BAS. He received a bronze medal at the 1982 Asian Games in New Delhi.

Career
In 1980, when the first Asian Swimming Championships was held at Dhaka, he was the captain of the Indian team and won two silver medals. After his retirement from professional swimming, he started coaching youngsters in swimming and water polo, and later became general secretary of District Swimming Association of Jalandhar.

Awards and recognition
He was awarded Maharaja Ranjit Singh Award for Swimming, given by Government of Punjab in 1978 and the Dhyan Chand Award, the highest award in Indian sports for lifetime achievement, given by Government of India in 2011.

Personal life
He owns a sports manufacturing unit in Jalandhar, and his son Taruwar Kohli is a cricketer with Indian Premier League (IPL). He is the Vice-President of Punjab Swimming Association, Member of the Selection Committee of Punjab Swimming Association Waterpolo Swimming, Honorary General Secretary District Swimming Association Jalandhar, Joint Secretary Shri Guru Gobind Singh Football Society REgd., Joint Secretary Ramesh Chander Memorial Hockey Society Regd.

References

Indian male swimmers
Living people
1953 births
Sportspeople from Jalandhar
Indian male water polo players
Indian sports coaches
Asian Games medalists in water polo
Water polo players at the 1982 Asian Games
Asian Games bronze medalists for India
Medalists at the 1982 Asian Games
Recipients of the Dhyan Chand Award
Swimming coaches
Swimmers from Punjab, India
20th-century Indian people
21st-century Indian people